Sir Theodore Ouseley Pike KCMG (2 August 1904 – 27 December 1987) was an Irish colonial administrator and a sports international.

Early life
Pike was born in Thurles in County Tipperary in 1904. In 1904, Ireland was a part of the United Kingdom of Great Britain and Ireland.

 Rugby international
In his youth, Pike was a keen sportsman: he played rugby union, usually as prop. He was good enough to play to international standard and represented Ireland, by then a divided nation politically but still fielding an All-Ireland rugby team, for two seasons. In 1927 and in 1928, Pike took part in 7 matches in the Five Nations Championship, playing against France and all the other Home Nations. In addition, Pike played for Britain in a test against Australia.

Career
Pike made his career in colonial administration, rising to become Governor and Commander-in-Chief of British Somaliland, now a part of Somalia, from 1954 to 1959. In 1956, he was knighted, as a Knight Commander of the Order of St Michael and St George, to become Sir Theodore Pike.

Later life
Sir Theodore retired to Guildford in Surrey and died in 1987.

References

1904 births
1987 deaths
Irish rugby union players
Ireland international rugby union players
Lansdowne Football Club players
British & Irish Lions rugby union players from Ireland
Rugby union props
Governors of British Somaliland